Joel Dolinski is an American football coach.  He served as the head football coach at Seton Hill University from 2008 through 2012.

Head coaching record

References

1975 births
Living people
American football offensive linemen
Bethany Bison football coaches
Cincinnati Bearcats football players
Cincinnati Bearcats football coaches
Seton Hill Griffins football coaches
People from Sewickley, Pennsylvania
Players of American football from Pennsylvania